The 2016 Phillips 66 Big 12 men's basketball tournament was a postseason men's basketball tournament for the Big 12 Conference. It was played from March 9 to 12, in Kansas City, Missouri at the Sprint Center. Kansas won the tournament for the 10th time and received the conference's automatic bid to the 2016 NCAA tournament.

Seeding
The Tournament consisted of a 10 team single-elimination tournament with the top 6 seeds receiving a bye.
Teams were seeded by record within the conference, with a tiebreaker system to seed teams with identical conference records.

Schedule

Bracket

Game summaries

First round

Quarterfinals

Semifinals

Championship

All-Tournament Team
Most Outstanding Player – Devonte’ Graham, Kansas

See also
2016 Big 12 Conference women's basketball tournament
2016 NCAA Division I men's basketball tournament
2015–16 NCAA Division I men's basketball rankings

References

External links
Official 2016 Big 12 Men's Basketball Tournament Bracket
 
 2016 Big 12 Men's Basketball Championship Media Guide

Tournament
Big 12 men's basketball tournament
Big 12 men's basketball tournament
Big 12 men's basketball tournament
College sports tournaments in Missouri
Basketball competitions in Kansas City, Missouri